Valsamata is a village in the municipal unit of Omala on the island of Kefalonia, Greece. It is located 9 km east of Argostoli and 17 km west of Poros. The village is situated in a valley between hills, at about 400 m elevation. The 1953 Ionian earthquake caused great damage in Valsamata.

Historical population

External links
GTP Travel Pages

References

Populated places in Cephalonia